The 2022 LKL Playoffs featured the eight best teams of Lietuvos krepšinio lyga (LKL) basketball league in Lithuania, competing for the championship spot. This will be the LKL playoffs' 27th edition. Rytas after 12 years achieved their 6th title. 

The quarter-finals and semi-finals will be played in a best-of-five format, with the higher seeded team playing the first, third and (if necessary) fifth game at home. The finals will be played in a best-of-seven format, with the higher seed team playing games 1, 3, 5 and 7 (if necessary) at home.

Schedule

Qualified teams

Notable events
 On 28 April 2022, all four Betsafe-LKL quarter-finals pairs are set.
 On 01 May 2022, the first playoff match took place. Rytas won a difficult victory against Dzūkija.
 On 07 May 2022, Lietkabelis won the decisive victory against Juventus and ended the quarter-finals by winning 3-0. Lietkabelis became the first participant in the Betsafe–LKL semi–finals.
 On 08 May 2022, Rytas finished its quarter-finals series 3-1 against Dzūkija and made it to the Betsafe-LKL semi-finals.
 On 11 May 2022, Žalgiris finished its quarter-finals series 3–2 by winning against Neptūnas and qualified for Betsafe–LKL semi-finals.
 On 03 June 2022, Žalgiris won the series for the third place 4-0 against Šiauliai–7bet and won the Betsafe-LKL bronze for the first time in the team's history.
 On 07 June 2022, Rytas after 12 years break won Betsafe–LKL championship and achieved their 6th title overall.

Bracket

Quarter–finals

|}

Rytas vs. Dzūkija

Cbet Jonava vs. Šiauliai–7bet

Žalgiris vs. Neptūnas

Lietkabelis vs. Uniclub Casino – Juventus

Semi–finals

|}

Rytas vs. Šiauliai–7bet

Žalgiris vs. Lietkabelis

Third place

|}

Žalgiris vs. Šiauliai–7bet

Finals

|}

Rytas vs. Lietkabelis

See also
 2020–21 LKL season
 2021 LKL Playoffs

References

External links
 LKL website

 Lietuvos krepšinio lyga playoffs